Manuel Goded Llopis (15 October 1882 – 12 August 1936) was a Spanish Army general who was one of the key figures in the July 1936 revolt against the democratically elected Second Spanish Republic. Having unsuccessfully led an attempted insurrection in Barcelona, he was captured and executed by the Republican government. Previously, Goded had distinguished himself in the Battle of Alhucemas of the Rif War.

Early life
He was born in the city of San Juan, the capital of Puerto Rico, then a Spanish colony. There, he received his primary and secondary education. His family moved to Spain after Puerto Rico became a possession of the United States by the Treaty of Paris of 1898, which ended the Spanish–American War. In Spain, he enrolled and was accepted in the Academy of Infantry, a military institution.

Rif War
Goded graduated from the academy and was assigned to various posts. In 1907, when 25 years old, he held the rank of captain. In 1919, a rebellion against Spanish colonial rule took place in Spanish Morocco, a Spanish protectorate. The rebel leader in what is also known as the Rif War was Abd-el-Krim. The Riffians, as the rebels became known, annihilated the army of Spanish General Manuel Fernández Silvestre at the Battle of Annual in 1921 and were poised to attack the Spanish enclave of Melilla. Generals Jose Millan Astray and Francisco Franco, who founded the Spanish Foreign Legion, fought against the Riifians on land.

In 1925, Goded led an amphibious landing at Alhucemas Bay (now Al Hoceima Bay) in what is known as the Battle of Alhucemas. It was considered as the beginning of the end of the Rif Rebellion. By 1927, the rebellion had ended, and Spain recaptured her lost territory. Goded was promoted to brigadier general and soon was named chief of staff of the Spanish Army of Africa.

Dictatorship and Second Republic
Goded at first supported the right-wing dictatorship of Miguel Primo de Rivera, which was established in 1923 with the consent of King Alfonso XIII. However, Goded's eventual criticism of the government led to his removal from the post.

In May 1936, Manuel Azaña became the second and last president of the Second Spanish Republic. Goded was named Chief of Staff of the Central Army but was again relieved of his position after a conflict with the government. When right-wing officers suspected of plotting against the government were reassigned, he was exiled to a remote post on the Balearic Islands.

Revolt and execution
When right-wing generals rebelled against the Popular Front government of the Second Republic in July 1936, Goded unsuccessfully led troops in the Catalan capital, Barcelona, after he had taken control of Mallorca and Ibiza. Catalonia, being among the most industrialised regions of Spain, was a stronghold of the organized left, and Goded's local operations failed. He was captured by government forces on August 11 and held on the prison ship Uruguay. Tried by a Republican military court and compelled to order his remaining troops, via radio, to surrender, he was condemned to die by firing squad. He was executed the next day at Montjuïc Castle in Barcelona.

Goded's death not only decapitated the Nationalist revolt in Barcelona and greater Catalonia but also removed one of the key personal and political rivals to the movement's eventual leader, Francisco Franco.

See also

List of Puerto Ricans
List of Puerto Rican military personnel
Spanish Civil War

Notes

References

1882 births
1936 deaths
People from San Juan, Puerto Rico
Puerto Rican Army personnel
Spanish generals
Puerto Rican military officers
People of the Rif War
Spanish military personnel of the Spanish Civil War (National faction)
Puerto Rican people of Spanish descent
People executed by Spain by firing squad
People killed by the Second Spanish Republic
Executed Puerto Rican people